Edward Silvester Morris (6 April 1849 – 14 November 1928) was an English cricketer.  Morris' batting and bowling styles are unknown.  He was born in Bedminster, Somerset.

Morris made two first-class appearances for Gloucestershire in 1870.  The first of these came against Surrey at The Oval.  In this match he batted once, scoring 17 runs before being dismissed by George Griffith.  The second of these came against the Marylebone Cricket Club at Lord's.  In this match, he scored 13 runs in Gloucestershire's only innings before being dismissed by Alfred Shaw.

Morris died in Rochdale, Lancashire on 14 November 1928.

References

External links
Edward Morris at ESPNcricinfo
Edward Morris at CricketArchive

1849 births
1928 deaths
Cricketers from Somerset
English cricketers
Gloucestershire cricketers